Canal+ Sport 5 former nSport+ is a Polish sports channel owned by ITI Group launched on 12 October 2006. The channel is available only for platform Platforma Canal+.

On April 4, 2022 at 2:20 a.m., the channel changed its name to Canal Sport 5.

Sports rights 
 Football
 Ekstraklasa
 Russian Cup
 Handball
 EHF Champions League
 Women's EHF Champions League
 Speedway
 ENEA Ekstraliga

References

External links 
 Official website 

Television channels in Poland
Sports television in Poland
Television channels and stations established in 2006